Vanilla leaf is a common name for several plants and may refer to:

Achlys, native to western North America and Japan
Carphephorus odoratissimus, native to the southeastern United States